At right is displayed the color forest green.  
Forest green refers to a green color said to resemble the color of the trees and other plants in a forest.

This web color, when written as computer code in HTML for website color display, is written in the form forestgreen (no space).

The first recorded use of forest green as a color name in English was in 1810.

Forest green is a representation of the average color of the leaves of the trees of a temperate zone deciduous forest.

In culture

Cartography 
 Forest green is used to represent deciduous forest on maps depicting natural vegetation.

Environmentalism 
 Forest green may be used to represent the Green movement, especially in graphic design for environmental literature regarding issues having to do with forest conservation. 
 A forest green environmentalist (also called a dark green environmentalist) is an environmentalist who is seriously committed to environmentalism.

School colors 
 Forest green is one of the school colors of The Evergreen State College, Agincourt Collegiate Institute, Wagner College, Cass Technical High School, The Westminster Schools, Newark Arts High School (Newark, New Jersey), Canyon Lake High School, St Robert Catholic High School, Westlake High School, Mesa Verde High School (Citrus Heights, California), and Elk Grove High School (Elk Grove Village, Illinois).

Scouting 
 Forest green is used in the uniforms of the Boy Scouts of America, Venture Scouts, and other Scouting organizations.

Military 
Forest green is a frequent color used in woodland camouflage. Beyond camo uniforms, soldiers will spray their weapons using a multitude of colors including forest green to what would otherwise be black or wooden material.

Sports 
 Forest green is one of the team colors of the Nottingham Hoods, an English basketball team. It is also found on the team colors of the Saskatchewan Roughriders, as related to the flag of Saskatchewan. The Minnesota Wild of the NHL has forest green as one of their team colors.

See also
 Pine green

References

 

Shades of green